"Come Walk with Me" is a song by the British recording artist M.I.A. for her fourth studio album, Matangi (2013). The track was written by Maya "M.I.A." Arulpragasam and Switch, and produced by the latter. M.I.A. first uploaded a demo of the track online in April 2012, and the final version of the song was self-released worldwide as a digital download, under exclusive license to Interscope Records, on 3 September 2013. The song was the third single from the album, and was performed the on The Colbert Report, Late Night with Jimmy Fallon, the 2013 YouTube Music Awards and during the Matangi Tour. "Come Walk with Me" was met with acclaim from music critics.

Music video
No music video was produced for the song, but a lyric video was uploaded to YouTube and Vevo to accompany the release. The clip illustrates the story of Krishna and includes various Hindu deities. It has been described as "insane" and as "a karaoke video on acid".

Track listing
Digital download
 "Come Walk with Me" – 4:47

Charts

Release history

References

2013 singles
2013 songs
British electronic songs
Interscope Records singles
M.I.A. (rapper) songs
Songs written by M.I.A. (rapper)
Songs written by Switch (songwriter)